Maxime Gingras may refer to:

 Maxime Gingras (ice hockey) (born 1978), Canadian ice hockey goaltender
 Maxime Gingras (skier) (born 1984), retired Canadian freestyle skier